Kagawa 2nd district is a constituency of the House of Representatives in the Diet of Japan (national legislature). It is located in Kagawa and includes the cities of Takamatsu and Marugame.

List of representatives

References 

Districts of the House of Representatives (Japan)